Lawless Code is a 1949 American Western film directed by Oliver Drake and written by Basil Dickey. The film stars Jimmy Wakely, Dub Taylor, Ellen Hall, Tris Coffin, Riley Hill and Kenne Duncan. The film was released on December 4, 1949, by Monogram Pictures.

Plot

Cast          
Jimmy Wakely as Jimmy Wakely
Dub Taylor as 'Cannonball' Taylor 
Ellen Hall as Rita Caldwell
Tris Coffin as Judge Harmon Steele
Riley Hill as Curley Blake
Kenne Duncan as Tom Blaine 
Myron Healey as Donald Martin
Terry Frost as Carter 
Beatrice Maude as Mrs. Caldwell
Steve Clark as Jed Gordon
Bud Osborne as Sheriff
Bob Curtis as Deputy
Carl Moore as The 'Blind' Man

References

External links
 

1949 films
American Western (genre) films
1949 Western (genre) films
Monogram Pictures films
Films directed by Oliver Drake
American black-and-white films
1940s English-language films
1940s American films